Pablo Arrarte (born 11 November 1980) is a Spanish sailor. He competed in the Star event at the 2004 Summer Olympics.

References

External links
 

1980 births
Living people
Spanish male sailors (sport)
Olympic sailors of Spain
Sailors at the 2004 Summer Olympics – Star
Sportspeople from Santander, Spain
Sailors (sport) from Cantabria